abbreviated as Nikkeidai (日経大, Nikkeidai) is a private university headquartered in Dazaifu, Fukuoka, Japan.

Overview 
The university is owned by Tsuzuki Ikuei Educational Institute (都築育英学園, Tsuzuki Ikuei Gakuen), which is in turn a member of the Tsuzuki Education Group (都築学園グループ, Tsuzuki Gakuen Gurūpu).

The university ranks 4th in Japan by number of international students. Over 80% of students at its Tokyo campus are from overseas.

History 
The school was established in 1968 as Daiichi University of Economics (第一経済大学, Daiichi Keizai Daigaku). It changed its name to Fukuoka University of Economics (福岡経済大学, Fukuoka Keizai Daigaku) in 2007 and adopted its present name in 2010.

Campuses 
The university comprises three undergraduate campuses: its main campus in Dazaifu, Fukuoka and additional campuses in Sannomiya, Kobe and Shibuya, Tokyo. The university also has a graduate school located in Shibuya, Tokyo.

Academics

Undergraduate 
The university comprises two faculties, Economics and Management, offering admission to the following departments:

 Faculty of Economics
 Department of Economics
 Department of Commerce
 Department of Health and Sports Management
 Faculty of Management
 Department of Management
 Department of Global Business
 Department of Creative Production

The Fukuoka campus offers admission to all departments, while the Tokyo campus offers admission to departments in the Faculty of Management only, and the Kobe campus offers admission to the Department of Commerce only.

Graduate 
The university’s graduate school comprises a single faculty, the Graduate School of Business, which offers Master's and Doctoral degrees in Management.

Notable people 
Notable people associated with the university include:

 Chihiro Anai, singer
ASKA, singer-songwriter
Shingo Arizono, football player
Chage, musician and radio personality
 Ryoji Katsuki, baseball player
 Kim Mu-young, baseball player
 Ryunosuke Noda, football player
 Naoki Nomura, football player

References

External links

 Official website 

Private universities and colleges in Japan
Universities and colleges in Fukuoka Prefecture
Buildings and structures in Dazaifu, Fukuoka
Educational institutions established in 1968
1968 establishments in Japan